Glossodoris vespa is a species of sea slug, a dorid nudibranch, a shell-less marine gastropod mollusk in the family Chromodorididae.

Distribution
This species is found only in Southern Queensland, Australia.

References

External links

Chromodorididae
Gastropods described in 1990